Al Gore, the 45th Vice President of the United States (1993–2001) and U.S. senator from Tennessee (1985–1993), has unsuccessfully run for president twice:

Al Gore 1988 presidential campaign
Al Gore 2000 presidential campaign